Dubai Official Gazette is the official publication of the Government of Dubai and publishes laws, ordinances and other regulations.

See also 

 List of government gazettes

References

External links 

 

Government gazettes
Daily newspapers published in the United Arab Emirates
1960s establishments in the United Arab Emirates